

Canadian Football News in 1935
The Winnipegs (soon to be known as the Blue Bombers in 1936) became the first Western Canadian team to win the Grey Cup by defeating the Hamilton Tigers, 18–12, in Hamilton.

The Calgary club changed it name to Bronks.

The Canadian Intercollegiate Rugby Football Union returns to play for the Grey Cup for one more season.

The Winnipeg Victoria Rugby Club reformed on February 22, 1935. The nucleus of the team would be made up of players who played the 1934 season for the Deer Lodge junior team.

Regular season

Final regular season standings

League Champions

Grey Cup playoffs
Note: All dates in 1935

BCRFU tie-breaker final
Meralomas advance to West SemifinalDivision finalsQueen's advances to the East SemifinalSarnia won the total-point series by 17–1. Sarnia advances to the East Final.https://news.google.com/newspapers?id=iYsjAAAAIBAJ&sjid=vJgFAAAAIBAJ&pg=6884%2C2706402 The Montreal Gazette – November 25, 1935

SemifinalsCalgary advances to the Western Title game.Winnipeg advances to the Western Title game.Hamilton advances to the East Final game.FinalsWinnipeg advances to the Grey Cup game.Hamilton advances to the Grey Cup game.Playoff bracket

Grey Cup Championship

1935 Ontario Rugby Football Union All-StarsNOTE: During this time most players played both ways, so the All-Star selections do not distinguish between some offensive and defensive positions.''
QB – Ab Box, Toronto Balmy Beach Beachers
FW – Gord Patterson, Sarnia Imperials
HB – Ormond Beach, Sarnia Imperials
HB – Hugh Sterling, Sarnia Imperials
HB – Rocky Parsaca, Sarnia Imperials
E  – Syd Reynolds, Toronto Balmy Beach Beachers
E  – Stan Reeve, Sarnia Imperials
C  – Bruce Spears, Sarnia Imperials
G – Pat Bulter, Sarnia Imperials
G – Bob Reid, Toronto Balmy Beach Beachers
T – Ernie Hempey, Toronto Balmy Beach Beachers
T – Cliff Parson, Sarnia Imperials

1935 Canadian Football Awards
 Jeff Russel Memorial Trophy (IRFU MVP) – Abe Eliowitz (RB), Ottawa Rough Riders
 Imperial Oil Trophy (ORFU MVP) - Hugh Sterling - Sarnia Imperials

References

 
Canadian Football League seasons